Porter Town Hall is a historic town hall located at Porter, Porter County, Indiana.  It was built in 1913, and is a two-story, square Bungalow / American Craftsman style red brick building. An addition was built in 1964. It features decorative brick pattern work, exposed rafter ends, eyebrow windows, and a belfry surrounded by a decorative wrought iron railing.

It was listed on the National Register of Historic Places in 2000.

References

City and town halls on the National Register of Historic Places in Indiana
Bungalow architecture in Indiana
Government buildings completed in 1913
Buildings and structures in Porter County, Indiana
National Register of Historic Places in Porter County, Indiana